Smalegga Spur is a small rock spur 3 nautical miles (6 km) south-southeast of Morkenatten Peak, Shcherbakov Range, in the Orvin Mountains of Queen Maud Land. Mapped by Norway from air photos and surveys by Norwegian Antarctic Expedition, 1956–60, and named Smalegga (the narrow ridge).

Ridges of Queen Maud Land
Princess Astrid Coast